Augusto Pacheco Fraga or simply Guto  (born May 4, 1988), is a professional Brazilian footballer who plays as a striker for Chinese club Nei Mongol Zhongyou.

Club career
Made professional debut for Internacional in a 1–1 draw away to Náutico on September 2, 2007, in the Campeonato Brasileiro.

Guto transferred to China League One side Chongqing Lifan F.C. in February 2012. He won China League One top scorer title in the 2014 season on Chongqing Lifan's promotion to the CSL. On 15 January 2016, Guto transferred to China League One side Wuhan Zall. He moved to fellow League One club Zhejiang Yiteng on 20 January 2017.

Career statistics 
Statistics accurate as of match played 11 October 2020.

Honours

Club
Chongqing Lifan
China League One: 2014

References

External links
 
  zerozero.pt
  CBF

1988 births
Living people
Brazilian footballers
Sport Club Internacional players
Sport Club do Recife players
Goiás Esporte Clube players
People from Criciúma
Chongqing Liangjiang Athletic F.C. players
Wuhan F.C. players
Zhejiang Yiteng F.C. players
Shaanxi Chang'an Athletic F.C. players
Inner Mongolia Zhongyou F.C. players
Expatriate footballers in China
Brazilian expatriate sportspeople in China
Chinese Super League players
China League One players
Association football forwards
Sportspeople from Santa Catarina (state)